Shree Sadan is a three-storey cottage used by King Birendra and his family. 

Shree Sadan was opened to the public in November 2020. It spans over 754 ropanis of land.

See also 
 Tribhuvan Sadan

References 

Buildings and structures in Kathmandu
Palaces in Nepal
Royal residences in Nepal
Shah palaces of Nepal